ABC South East NSW is an ABC Local Radio station based in Bega. It broadcasts to the southern part of the South Coast and the Monaro regions in New South Wales.  This includes the towns of Cooma, Batemans Bay, Moruya and Eden.

The station began as 2BA in 1956 and 2CP in 1966 and is heard on these main AM frequencies along with a number of FM repeaters;

 103.5 FM Batemans Bay, Moruya
 106.3 FM Eden
 94.1 FM Bombala
 95.5 FM Jindabyne
 88.9 FM Thredbo

The Batemans Bay, Eden and Bombala translators are known as "2BA/T", whilst those in Jindabyne and Thredbo are known as "2CP/T".

See also
 List of radio stations in Australia

References

 

South East NSW
Radio stations in New South Wales
Radio stations established in 1956
South Coast (New South Wales)